Sanchuniathon (probably from Phoenician:  , "Sakon has given"), also known as Sanchoniatho the Berytian, was a Phoenician author. His three works, originally written in the Phoenician language, survive only in partial paraphrase and a summary of a Greek translation by Philo of Byblos recorded by the Christian bishop Eusebius. These few fragments comprise the most extended literary source concerning Phoenician religion in either Greek or Latin: Phoenician sources, along with all of Phoenician literature, were lost with the parchment on which they were written.

The author
All knowledge of Sanchuniathon and his work comes from the Praeparatio Evangelica of Eusebius (I. chs ix-x), which contains some information about him, along with the only surviving excerpts from his writing, as summarized and quoted from his purported translator, Philo of Byblos.

Eusebius quotes neo-Platonist writer Porphyry as stating that Sanchuniathon of Berytus (Beirut) wrote the truest history because he obtained records from Hierombalus priest of Ieuo (Ancient Greek: Ἰευώ), that Sanchuniathon dedicated his history to Abibalus (Abibaal) king of Berytus, and that it was approved by the king and other investigators, the date of this writing being before the Trojan War (around 1200 BC) approaching close to the time of Moses, "when Semiramis was queen of the Assyrians." Thus Sanchuniathon is placed firmly in the mythic context of the pre-Homeric Greek Heroic Age, an antiquity from which no other Greek or Phoenician writings are known to have survived to the time of Philo.

Sanchuniathon claims to have based his work on "collections of secret writings of the Ammouneis discovered in the shrines", sacred lore deciphered from mystic inscriptions on the pillars which stood in the Phoenician temples, lore which exposed the truth—later covered up by allegories and myths—that the gods were originally human beings who came to be worshipped after their deaths and that the Phoenicians had taken what were originally names of their kings and applied them to elements of the cosmos (compare euhemerism), worshipping forces of nature and the sun, moon, and stars. Eusebius cites Sanchuniathon in his attempt to discredit pagan religion based on such foundations.

This rationalizing euhemeristic slant and the emphasis on Beirut, a city of great importance in the late classical period but apparently of little importance in ancient times, suggests that the work itself is not nearly as old as it claims to be. Some have suggested it was forged by Philo himself or assembled from various traditions and presented within an authenticating pseudepigraphical format to give the material a patina of believability. Philo may have translated genuine Phoenician works ascribed to an ancient writer known as Sanchuniathon but in fact written in more recent times. This judgment is echoed by the  Encyclopædia Britannica Eleventh Edition, which described Sanchuniathon as "belong[ing] more to legend than to history."

Not all readers have taken such a critical view:

However that may be, much of what has been preserved in this writing, despite the euhemeristic interpretation given it, turned out to be supported by the Ugaritic mythological texts excavated at Ras Shamra (ancient Ugarit) in Syria since 1929; Otto Eissfeldt demonstrated in 1952 that it does incorporate genuine Phoenician elements that can now be related to the Ugaritic texts, some of which, as shown in extant versions of Sanchuniathon, remained unchanged since the second millennium BC. The modern consensus is that Philo's treatment of Sanchuniathon offered a Hellenistic view of Phoenician materials written between the time of Alexander the Great and the first century BC, if it was not a literary invention of Philo.

The work
In surviving fragments of the text, it can be difficult to ascertain whether Eusebius is citing Philo's translation of Sanchuniathon or speaking in his own voice. Another difficulty is the substitution of Greek proper names for Phoenician ones and the possible corruption of some Phoenician names that do appear.

Philosophical creation story
A philosophical creation story traced to "the cosmogony of Taautus, whom Philo explicitly identifies with the Egyptian Thoth—"the first who thought of the invention of letters, and began the writing of records"—which begins with Erebus and Wind, between which Eros 'Desire' came to be. From this was produced Môt 'Death' but which the account says may mean 'mud'. In a mixed confusion, the germs of life appear, and intelligent animals called Zophasemin (probably best translated 'observers of heaven') formed together as an egg. The account is not clear. Then Môt burst forth into light and the heavens were created and the various elements found their stations.

Following the etymological reasoning of Jacob Bryant in regard to the meaning of Môt, it can be noted that according to Ancient Egyptian mythology, Ma'at, wife of Thoth, is the personification of the fundamental order of the universe, without which all of creation would perish.

Allegorical culture heroes
According to the text, Copias and his wife Baau (translated as Nyx 'Night') give birth to mortals Aeon and Protogonus 'firstborn'); "and ... when droughts occurred, they stretched out their hands to heaven towards the sun; for him alone (he says) they regarded as god the Lord of Heaven, calling him Beelsamen, which is in the Phoenician language 'lord of heaven', and in Greek 'Zeus.'" (Eusebius, I, x). A race of Titan-like mountain beings arose:
 "sons of surpassing size and stature, whose names were applied to the mountains which they occupied ... and they got their names, he says, from their mothers, as the women in those days had free intercourse with any whom they met."
Various descendants are listed, many of whom have allegorical names but are described in the quotations from Philo as mortals who first made particular discoveries or who established particular customs.

The history of the gods
The work includes a genealogy and history of various northwest Semitic deities who were widely worshipped. Many are listed in the genealogy under the names of their counterparts in the Greek pantheon, Hellenized forms of their Semitic names, or both. The additional names given for some of these deities appear usually in parentheses in the table below. Only equations made in the text appear here, but many of the hyperlinks point to the northwest Semitic deities that are probably intended. See the notes below the table for translations of the unlinked and several other names.

Translations of Greek forms: arotrios, 'of husbandry, farming', autochthon (for autokhthon) 'produced from the ground', epigeius (for epigeios) 'from the earth', eros 'desire', ge 'earth', hypsistos 'most high', pluto (for plouton) 'wealthy', pontus (for pontos) 'sea', pothos 'longing', siton 'grain', thanatos 'death', uranus (for ouranos) 'sky'.
Notes on etymologies: Anobret: proposed connections include ʿyn = "spring", by Renan ("Memoire", 281), and to ʿAnat rabbat = "Lady ʿAnat" by Clemen  (Die phönikische Religion, 69–71); Ieoud/Iedud: perhaps from a Phoenician cognate of Hebrew yḥyd = "only" or of Hebrew ydyd = "beloved".

As in the Greek and Hittite theogonies, Sanchuniathon's Elus/Cronus overthrows his father Sky or Uranus and castrates him. However, Zeus Demarûs (that is, Hadad Ramman), purported son of Dagon but actually son of Uranus, eventually joins with Uranus and wages war against Cronus. To El/Cronus is attributed the practice of circumcision. Twice we are told that El/Cronus sacrificed his own son. At some point, peace is made, and Zeus Adados (Hadad) and Astarte reign over the land with Cronus' permission. An account of the events is written by the Cabeiri and by Asclepius, under Thoth's direction.

About serpents
A passage about serpent worship follows in which it is not clear what part is from Sanchuniathon and what part from Philo of Byblus:

On the Phoenician Alphabet
A further work of Sanchuniathon noted by Eusebius (P.E. 1.10.45) is a treatise On the Phoenician Alphabet.

See also
 Ancient Canaanite religion
 Phoenician religion

Notes

Bibliography

External links

English translations
 Tertullian.org: Eusebius Praeparatio, Book 1, chapters ix-x (Search on Sanchuniathon).
 Sacred Texts: Ancient Fragments, ed. and trans. I. P. Cory, 1832: "The Theology of the Phœnicians from Sanchoniatho"

Other links
 
 

 
Ancient writers
Historians of Phoenicia
Phoenician language
Phoenician writers
Writers of lost works